Pendle Borough Council elections are generally held three years out of every four, with a third of the council elected each time. Pendle Borough Council is the local authority for the non-metropolitan district of Pendle in Lancashire, England. Since the last boundary changes in 2020, 33 councillors have been elected from 12 wards.

Political control
The first election to the council was held in 1973, initially operating as a shadow authority before coming into its powers on 1 April 1974. Since 1973 political control of the council has been held by the following parties:

Leadership
The leaders of the council since 2015 have been:

Council elections

Borough result maps

By-election results
By-elections occur when seats become vacant between council elections. Below is a summary of recent by-elections; full by-election results can be found by clicking on the by-election name.

References

External links
Pendle Council